Shelayna Oskan-Clarke (born 20 January 1990) is a British middle-distance runner. Shelayna is currently the British 800m champion.  She competed in the 800 metres event at the 2015 World Championships in Athletics in Beijing, Where she finished 5th in the final. In 2016, she won the women's 800m at the Anniversary Games, and also reached the semi final at the Rio Olympic Games, narrowly missing out on a place in the final. In 2019, Shelayna took the gold medal at the European Athletics Indoor Championships in Glasgow.

International competitions

Personal bests
Outdoor
400 metres – 53.20 (Birmingham 2011)
800 metres – 1:58.86 (Beijing 2015)
1500 metres – 4:28.29 (Watford 2014)
Indoor
400 metres – 54.48 (Birmingham 2012)
800 metres – 1:59.81 (Birmingham 2018)

References

External links

1990 births
Living people
British female middle-distance runners
English female middle-distance runners
British female sprinters
English female sprinters
Olympic female middle-distance runners
Olympic athletes of Great Britain
Athletes (track and field) at the 2016 Summer Olympics
Commonwealth Games competitors for England
Athletes (track and field) at the 2018 Commonwealth Games
World Athletics Championships athletes for Great Britain
European Athletics Indoor Championships winners
British Athletics Championships winners
Black British sportswomen